Cencioni  is a type of pasta. The name derives from the Italian for little rag.  Cencioni are oval and petal-shaped, with a slight curve, larger and flatter than orecchiette, with a more irregular shape and a rough texture to one side to help sauces cling better.

See also
Pasta
List of pasta

References

Types of pasta